Elections were held in the Australian state of Victoria on 27 June 1964 to elect the 66 members of the state's Legislative Assembly and 17 members of the 34-member Legislative Council. The Liberal and Country Party (LCP) government of Premier Henry Bolte won a fourth term in office.

Key dates

Results

Legislative Assembly

The election produced almost no change in the electoral balance.

|}

Legislative Council

|}

Seats changing hands 

 Members listed in italics did not recontest their seats.
 In addition, Labor retained the seat of Broadmeadows which it had won from the LCP at the 1962 by-election.

Post-election pendulum

See also
 Candidates of the 1964 Victorian state election
 Members of the Victorian Legislative Assembly, 1961–1964
 Members of the Victorian Legislative Assembly, 1964–1967
 Bolte Ministry

References

Elections in Victoria (Australia)
1964 elections in Australia
1960s in Victoria (Australia)
June 1964 events in Australia